The 2004 Kazakhstan Hockey Cup was the 3rd edition of the Kazakhstan Hockey Cup, the national ice hockey cup competition in Kazakhstan. Four teams participated and Kazzinc-Torpedo won its 3rd cup.

Results

References

2004–05 in Kazakhstani ice hockey
Kazakhstan Hockey Cup